Baltis was an ancient Arabian goddess. She was revered at Carrhae and identified with the planet Venus.

Isaac of Antioch mentions Baltis in a text written in the middle of the 5th century CE as a deity worshipped by the Arabs. Baltis here is equivalent to Ishtar (Inanna), an ancient Mesopotamian goddess.

See also	
Beltis
Religion in pre-Islamic Arabia

References

West Semitic goddesses
Stellar goddesses
Venusian deities